Robert Fabian is a retired Austrian slalom canoeist who competed from the mid-1950s to the late 1960s. He won two medals at the ICF Canoe Slalom World Championships with a silver in 1955 (Folding K-1 team) and a bronze in 1965 (K-1 team).

References

Austrian male canoeists
Possibly living people
Year of birth missing (living people)
Medalists at the ICF Canoe Slalom World Championships